Most of the hundreds of United States Navy aircraft squadrons created since World War I no longer exist, having been "disestablished". Another 40 or so have been "deactivated", currently existing only "on paper" in an inactive status.

It has never been correct to refer to U.S. Navy aircraft squadrons as being "commissioned" or "decommissioned". Proper usage until 1998 was that squadrons were "established" and "disestablished"; since 1998, squadrons are "established", "deactivated" and sometimes "reactivated".

U. S. Navy Aircraft Squadron Designation System
Tracking the history and lineage of U.S. Navy aircraft squadrons can be difficult because squadron designations were often reused under the system that pertained until 1998.

Under pre-1998 rules, a squadron could be "established," "disestablished" and "re-designated." A squadron's history and lineage began when it was established and ended when it was disestablished. When a squadron was disestablished or re-designated, its former designation became available for reuse by a new or re-designating squadron, just as the name of a decommissioned ship (e.g., USS Enterprise) might be given to a new vessel. The new or re-designated squadron could carry on the traditions, nickname, or the insignia of the previous squadron, but it could not lay claim to the history or lineage of that previous squadron any more than a newly commissioned USS Enterprise could lay claim to the history of a former ship of that name.

Re-designation might assign a squadron a new number under the same basic designation (e.g., VF-151 to VF-192), or change the entire designation (HS-3 to HSC-9). A squadron could be re-designated several times, retaining its lineage throughout. For example, on 15 July 1948, Fighter Squadron 153 (the second squadron to use the VF-153 designation) was established. On 15 February 1950, the squadron was re-designated to VF-194. On 4 May 1955, it was again re-designated, to VA-196, reflecting its shift from a fighter squadron to an attack squadron. On 21 March 1997, the squadron was disestablished. It was one squadron with three designations, not three squadrons. Another example is the current VFA-14, which has been re-designated 15 times since its establishment in September 1919.

This system changed in March 1998 with the issuance of Chief of Naval Operations Instruction (OPNAVINST) 5030.4E. U.S. Navy aircraft squadrons are no longer disestablished but "deactivated." A deactivated squadron remains in existence, though only "on paper", awaiting possible future "re-activation". Neither its designation nor any previous designations are available for use by a new squadron. A re-activated squadron would trace its lineage back to the squadron's original establishment date, including its inactive period. The current update of OPNAVINST 3050.4 contains a list of all currently active and deactivated U.S. Navy aircraft squadrons.

Squadrons that have not been disestablished or deactivated are in the List of United States Navy aircraft squadrons.

The tables below are organized by squadron designation. Squadrons that have been re-designated appear under each of its various designations, either in a single table or across multiple tables. The tables are ordered by time period; designations are listed in the period during which they were last in use.

Squadron Designations last used between 1921 and 1947
This section contains squadrons whose designations were discontinued by 1947. It does not include squadrons under the VF designation, which was used until 2006, or VP, which remains in use. Most of the squadrons listed in this section were disestablished by the end of World War II. Others remained active under different designations for decades. A few still exist today.

VC: Disestablished Composite squadrons
The VC designation was first created on 1 March 1943 when Escort Scouting Squadrons (VGS) which were based aboard Escort Carriers (CVEs) were redesignated Composite Squadrons (VC). These VC squadrons flew combinations of fighters, dive bombers and/or torpedo bombers from Escort Carriers through WWII, at the end of which they were all disestablished by the end of 1945. There were two later uses of the VC designation. The first from 1948 to 1956 and the second from 1965 to 2008. There have been multiple unrelated squadrons using the same VC designations through the years. For example, the last two VC squadrons were VC-6 and VC-8 which were deactivated in 2008 and 2003 respectively. Both of those squadrons were the third squadron to use each of those designations, and neither squadron had any relation to earlier squadrons designated VC-6 or VC-8. The first VC-6 and VC-8 were WWII Escort Carrier composite squadrons, the second VC-6 was a heavy attack squadron which was redesignated VAH-6 then RVAH-6 and the second VC-8 was also a heavy attack squadron which was redesignated VAH-11 then RVAH-11.

Note: The parenthetical (1st), (2nd), (3rd) etc... appended to designations in the tables below are not a part of the squadron designation system. They are added to indicate that the designation was used more than once during the history of U.S. Naval Aviation and which use of the designation is indicated. Absence indicates that the designation was used only once.

There were approximately 90 VC squadrons which existed from 1943 to 1945. The table below contains a partial list of WWII VC squadrons

VCS: Disestablished Cruiser Scouting Squadron

VH: Disestablished Rescue Squadrons

VJ: Disestablished Utility or General Utility squadrons
VJ designated Utility squadron from 1925 to 1946. In 1946 the designation for Utility Squadron was changed to "VU". The designation was later used from 1952 to 1956 to designate weather squadrons and photographic squadrons

VO: Disestablished Spotting or Observation squadrons
The VO designation was one of the earliest by the U.S. Navy. It first appeared in 1922 to designate "Spotting Squadrons" which provided aerial naval gunfire spotting for battleships and cruisers. In 1923 the designation was changed to "Observation Plane Squadron" or "Observation Squadron" and continued in use as such until 1945 when the designation was discontinued. There were two later uses of the VO designation, from 1947 to 1949 and again during the Vietnam War from 1967 to 1968.

VS: Disestablished Scouting squadrons and VS designations no longer in use
The VS designation first appeared in 1922 as the designation for scouting squadrons. It was used as the designation for scouting squadron until it was formally removed from the squadron designation system in 1946, but it had ceased to exist in 1943 as by the end of that year VS squadrons had all been redesignated to VF, VT, VC or VCS (cruiser scouting squadron). There were approximately 26 squadrons designated VS (scouting squadron) between the years 1922 and 1943, one of them (the second Scouting Squadron VS-41) still exists today as VFA-14, the rest were all disestablished, or redesignated then disestablished by the end of 1949. There was a later use of the VS designation from 1950 to 2009 to designate "Antisubmarine" or "Sea Control squadrons"
       
Note: The parenthetical (first use), (second use), (1st), (2nd), (3rd) etc... appended to some designations in the table below are not a part of the squadron designation system. They are added to indicate that the designation was used more than once during the history of U.S. Naval Aviation and which use of the designation is indicated. Absence indicates that the designation was used only once.

VT: Disestablished Torpedo squadrons and VT designations no longer in use
The VT designation is one of the earliest used by the U.S. Navy. A "Torpedo Plane Squadron" existed as early as 1920 but the use of abbreviated squadron designations (such as "VT") did not come into accepted use until 1922. From 1922 to 1930 it designated "Torpedo & Bombing Plane Squadrons" or "Torpedo and Bombing Squadrons". In 1930 it designated "Torpedo Squadrons" until 1946 when all remaining VT squadrons were redesignated Attack (VA) squadrons and the VT designation disappeared. Between 1927 and 1937 a suffix letter was added after the designation number to identify to which fleet or Naval District the squadron belonged: B for Battle Fleet, S for Scouting Fleet, A for Asiatic Fleet or D followed by a Naval District number for those squadrons assigned to Naval Districts. On 15 November 1946 the squadron designation system underwent a major change; the 17 still existing VT and 14 still existing Bombing (VB) squadrons were redesignated Attack (VA) squadrons and the VT and VB designations were eliminated. On 1 May 1960 the VT designation was resurrected as the designation for training squadrons but there is no relationship between the training squadrons which have used the VT designation since 1960 and the Torpedo or Torpedo and Bombing squadrons of the 1920s to 1940s. The VTN designation was used from 1944 to 1946 to designate "Night Torpedo Squadrons"

The table below is a partial list of the approximately 90 to 100 squadrons which carried the VT designation between 1921 and 1946.

Squadron Designations last used between 1948 and 1979
Naval Aviation underwent massive changes after WWII with great reductions in numbers and with new technologies that fostered the creation of new types of aircraft squadrons. The designations listed in this section reflect the new squadron types that were created, those such as nuclear attack, airborne early warning and "all weather" (radar equipped) squadrons. Additionally, there were a few others developed specifically for roles necessitated by the Vietnam War which can be found herein. Others such as electronic warfare (VAQ) and carrier based early warning (VAW) squadrons were also created during this time period but are not included in this section as those designations continue in use today.

VA(AW): Disestablished All Weather Attack squadrons
The VA(AW) designation was created in 1956 when VC squadrons were redesignated using role descriptive designators. VC-33 and VC-35 had by then become attack squadrons with radar and electronic countermeasures equipped aircraft. All weather attack squadrons provided detachments of radar and electronic countermeasure equipped attack aircraft to Carrier Air Groups for night and all weather operations.

VAH: Disestablished Heavy Attack squadrons and VAH designations no longer in use
The VAH designation was established in 1955 when the Composite (VC) squadrons flying Heavy Attack aircraft (nuclear bombers) were redesignated Heavy Attack (VAH) squadrons. The designation was retired in 1971 with the disestablishment of the last VAH squadron (squadrons listed below with disestablishment dates after 1971 had been redesignated RVAH squadrons by 1966 except for VAH-2, 4 and 10 which were eventually redesignated VAQ squadrons). With the end of the Navy's nuclear bomber role, the VAH squadrons based on the east coast were redesignated RVAH squadrons and were equipped with the RA-5C Vigilante Reconnaissance aircraft. VAH squadrons based on the west coast retained the VAH designation but their A-3B Skywarriors were converted to KA-3B aerial tankers. By the late 1960s, electronic jamming equipment had been added to some KA-3B tankers and those "EKA-3B" aircraft led to the creation of VAQ squadrons.

RVAH: Disestablished Reconnaissance Attack squadrons
The RVAH designation was created in 1964 when the Navy's nuclear bomber role was ended and the Heavy Attack (VAH) squadrons which were then equipped with the A-5A Vigilante nuclear bombers were converted to Reconnaissance squadrons and their A-5A nuclear bombers were converted to RA-5C reconnaissance aircraft. Those VAH squadrons which were then still equipped with the A-3B remained designated Heavy Attack (VAH) squadrons. The designation was retired in 1979 with the disestablishment of the last RA-5C squadron.

VAL: Disestablished Light attack squadrons
The Light Attack (VAL) designation was created in 1969 and designated only one squadron (VAL-4) which was established to support riverine and special operations during the Vietnam War. The designation was retired with the disestablishment of the squadron. A Helicopter Light Attack (HAL) designation had been created in 1967 to designate a single light attack helicopter squadron (HAL-3). HAL-3 and VAL-4 conducted operations in the Mekong Delta region of South Vietnam.

VC: Disestablished and Deactivated Composite squadrons
This second use of the VC designation began in 1948 to designate squadrons which were composed of detachments of aircraft that deployed aboard aircraft carriers with the carrier air group (later carrier air wing) conducting specialized missions. Missions included: All-Weather/Night Fighter; Heavy Attack (Nuclear Bombers); Airborne Early Warning; Anti-Submarine Warfare; and Photographic Reconnaissance. Single digit numbers designated the Composite All Weather Fighter and the Heavy Attack squadrons, teens designated Composite Airborne Early Warning Squadrons, numbers in the 20s and 30s designated Composite Anti-Submarine Squadrons, and the numbers in the 60s designated Composite Photographic Squadrons. By 1956 these squadrons had all been redesignated as VF(AW), VAH, VAW, VS, VA(AW) or VFP depending on the specific mission, and the VC designation once again ceased to exist. There have been multiple unrelated squadrons using the same VC designations through the years. For example, the last two VC squadrons were VC-6 and VC-8 which were deactivated in 2008 and 2003 respectively. Both of those squadrons were the third squadron to use each of those designations, and neither squadron had any relation to earlier squadrons designated VC-6 or VC-8. The first VC-6 and VC-8 were WWII Escort Carrier composite squadrons, the second VC-6 was a heavy attack squadron which was redesignated VAH-6 then RVAH-6 and the second VC-8 was also a heavy attack squadron which was redesignated VAH-11 then RVAH-11.

The table below does not list disestablished squadrons; it lists squadron designations which are no longer in use. Some of the squadron designations in the table belonged to squadrons which have been disestablished but some belonged to squadrons which have been deactivated and still exist in an inactive status.

Note: The parenthetical (1st), (2nd), (3rd) etc... appended to designations in the tables below are not a part of the squadron designation system. They are added to indicate that the designation was used more than once during the history of U.S. Naval Aviation and which use of the designation is indicated. Absence indicates that the designation was used only once.

VAP: Disestablished Heavy Photographic Reconnaissance squadrons
In 1952, two reconnaissance squadrons were established and designated "Photographic Squadron (VJ)" (note: the VJ designation, at the same time also designated "Weather Squadron" or "Weather Reconnaissance Squadron"). In 1956 the Photographic Squadrons (VJ) were redesignated to "Heavy Photographic Reconnaissance Squadron (VAP)". For a short period from 1959 to 1961 one VAP squadron was redesignated a "Photographic Composite Squadron (VCP)" but in 1961 it reverted to its previous VAP designation.

Note: The parenthetical (1st), (2nd) etc... appended to designations in the tables below are not a part of the squadron designation system. They are added to indicate that the designation was used more than once during the history of U.S. Naval Aviation and which use of the designation is indicated. Absence indicates that the designation was used only once.

VCP: Disestablished Composite Photographic Reconnaissance squadrons
For a short period from 1959 to 1961 one VAP and one VFP squadron were redesignated "Photographic Composite Squadron (VCP)" but in 1961 they reverted to their previous VAP or VFP designation.

VF(AW): Disestablished All Weather Fighter squadrons
The VF(AW) designation was created in 1956 when VC squadrons were redesignated with role descriptive designators. All Weather Fighter squadrons were equipped with radar equipped fighters for night and all weather use. VF(AW)-3 operated as a night fighter squadron when it was still designated VC-3 but became a jet transition unit prior to its being redesignated an all weather fighter squadron. The squadron which was the second to use the VF(AW)-3 designation was a continental defense interceptor squadron. VF(AW)-4 provided night fighter detachments to Carrier Air Groups.

VJ: Disestablished Weather or Weather Reconnaissance squadrons and Heavy Photographic Reconnaissance squadrons
From 1952 to 1956 the VJ designation identified "Photographic Squadron" but for a year from 1952 to 1953 it also designated "Weather" or "Weather Reconniassance Squadron" In 1952, two reconnaissance squadrons were established and designated "Photographic Squadron (VJ)" 61 and 62. In 1956 Photographic Squadrons VJ-61 and VJ-62 were redesignated to "Heavy Photographic Reconnaissance Squadron" (VAP) 61 and 62.

VO: Disestablished Observation squadrons
This last use of the VO designation designated observation squadrons from 1967 to 1968 during the Vietnam War. The designation has not been used since 1968.

VU: Disestablished Utility squadrons
The VU designation was used from 1946 to 1965. Prior to the creation of the "VU" designation utility squadrons were designated "VJ". In 1965 still existing VU squadrons were redesignated Fleet Composite (VC) squadrons (third use of the VC designation).

The table below contains a partial list of VU squadrons

VW: Disestablished Airborne Early Warning squadrons and Weather Reconnaissance squadrons
From its creation in 1952 until 1971 the VW designation designated "Air Early Warning Squadron", "Airborne Early Warning Squadron", or "Fleet Early Warning Squadron". By 1961 the VW squadrons which were still in existence were transitioned to destructive weather early warning or weather reconnaissance as a primary mission while retaining airborne early warning as a secondary role. In 1955 and 1956 six new VW squadrons were established to operate as early warning squadrons in the Atlantic and Pacific Barriers which were seaward extensions of the nation's Distant Early Warning (DEW) Line. These "barrier" VW squadrons did not operate as weather reconnaissance squadrons and they were all disestablished by 1965. In 1967 one of the two remaining VW squadrons was renamed a "Weather Reconnaissance Squadron" (while retaining the VW designation) while the other retained the "Airborne Early Warning" name even though its primary role was also weather reconnaissance. In 1971 that squadron was disestablished and thereafter until the single remaining VW squadron was disestablished in 1975 the VW designation designated solely "Weather Reconnaissance Squadron". In 1975 the VW designation cease being used.

Squadron Designations last used between 1980 and 2009
Between 1980 and 2010, the rise of the multi-mission fighter-attack aircraft ended the VF and VA designations. As well, the end of the Cold War eliminated the need for squadron types, such as VS, geared solely to countering a peer competitor.

VA: Disestablished and Deactivated Attack squadrons and VA designations no longer in use
On 15 November 1946, Bombing (VB) and Torpedo (VT) squadrons were redesignated Attack squadrons (VA) and the VB and VT designations retired.

The rules governing the squadron designation system changed twice between 1946 and 1996, when the last Attack squadron switched to the F/A-18 Hornet and was redesignated a Strike Fighter (VFA) squadron. Sometimes a single squadron was redesignated several times; sometimes a given designation was assigned to several distinct squadrons.

The list below is not a list of disestablished squadrons; it is a list of squadron designations which are no longer in use. In many cases a single squadron carried multiple designations. Most of the squadron designations in the list belonged to squadrons which have been disestablished, but also included are former designations of some VFA squadrons which are still active. Note that many squadrons were designated as both VA and VF squadrons at different times during their existence. This list includes all "VA" designations which have been used by U.S. Navy aircraft squadrons except for those assigned to USNR squadrons which existed before 1970 unless they were activated, in which case they are included.

Note: The parenthetical (first use), (second use), (1st), (2nd), (3rd) etc... appended to some designations in the table below are not a part of the squadron designation system. They are added to indicate that the designation was used more than once during the history of U.S. Naval Aviation and which use of the designation is indicated. Absence indicates that the designation was used only once.

VAK: Disestablished Tactical Aerial Refueling squadrons
The VAK designation was established in 1979. It was only applied to two USNR squadrons then designated as VAQ squadrons but which performed tanking as their primary mission. It was discontinued in 1989 with the disestablishment of the last of the two squadrons.

VC: Disestablished and Deactivated Fleet Composite squadrons and VC designations no longer in use
This third and last use of the VC designation was instituted in 1965 as a redesignation of existing "utility" (VU) squadrons which were utility or support squadrons and were usually composed of more than one type aircraft conducting missions such as aerial target support, missile range support, fighter training as adversary aircraft and other miscellaneous missions. There have been multiple unrelated squadrons using the same VC designations through the years. For example, the last two VC squadrons were VC-6 and VC-8 which were deactivated in 2008 and 2003 respectively. Both of those squadrons were the third squadron to use each of those designations, and neither squadron had any relation to earlier squadrons designated VC-6 or VC-8. The first VC-6 and VC-8 were WWII Escort Carrier composite squadrons, the second VC-6 was a heavy attack squadron which was redesignated VAH-6 then RVAH-6 and the second VC-8 was also a heavy attack squadron which was redesignated VAH-11 then RVAH-11.

The table below does not list disestablished squadrons; it lists squadron designations which are no longer in use. Some of the squadron designations in the table belonged to squadrons which have been disestablished but some belonged to squadrons which have been deactivated and still exist in an inactive status.

Note: The parenthetical (1st), (2nd), (3rd) etc... appended to designations in the tables below are not a part of the squadron designation system. They are added to indicate that the designation was used more than once during the history of U.S. Naval Aviation and which use of the designation is indicated. Absence indicates that the designation was used only once.

VF: Disestablished and Deactivated Fighter squadrons and VF designations no longer in use

VFP: Disestablished Light Photographic Reconnaissance squadrons
In 1949, two new Photographic Reconnaissance squadrons were established as "Composite Squadrons" VC-61 and VC-62 (see the Disestablished and Deactivated Composite (VC) (second use of the designation) section). In 1956 VC-61 and VC-62 were redesignated "Light Photographic Reconnaissance Squadron (VFP)". For a short period from 1959 to 1961 one VFP squadron was redesignated "Photographic Composite Squadron (VCP)" but in 1961 it reverted to its previous VFP designation.

Note: The parenthetical (1st), (2nd) etc... appended to designations in the tables below are not a part of the squadron designation system. They are added to indicate that the designation was used more than once during the history of U.S. Naval Aviation and which use of the designation is indicated. Absence indicates that the designation was used only once.

VS: Disestablished and Deactivated Air Anti-Submarine and Sea Control squadrons
The VS designation first appeared in 1922 as the designation for scouting squadrons. It was used as the designation for scouting squadron until it was formally removed from the squadron designation system in 1946, but it had ceased to exist in 1943 as by the end of that year VS squadrons had all been redesignated to VF, VT, VC or VCS (cruiser scouting squadron). In 1950 the VS designation was resurrected and VC squadrons which operated Anti-Submarine Aircraft were redesignated Air Anti-Submarine Squadrons (VS). In September 1993, the name of the VS designation was changed from "Air Anti-Submarine Squadron" to "Sea Control Squadron" as by that time all VS squadrons were flying the S-3B Viking which was capable of both Anti-Submarine Warfare and Anti-Surface Warfare and the new name better described the capabilities of the VS squadrons All VS squadrons which existed at the time of that name change were renamed from "Air Anti-Submarine Squadron-__" to "Sea Control Squadron-__". The designation is no longer in active use but is still attached to eleven deactivated VS squadrons

The table below does not list disestablished squadrons; it is a list of squadron designations which are no longer in active use. Most of the designations in the table belonged to squadrons which have been disestablished but some belong to squadrons which still exist in an inactive status.

Note: The parenthetical (1st), (2nd), (3rd) etc... appended to some designations and the (first use), (second use), (third use) etc... in the table below are not a part of the squadron designation system. They are added to indicate that the designation was used more than once to designate an Antisubmarine (or after 1993, a Sea Control) squadron and which use of the designation is indicated. They are not in series with any VS designations which existed from 1922 to 1943 to designate Scouting Squadrons. Absence indicates that the designation was used only once to designate an Antisubmarine or Sea Control squadron.

VXE and VXN: Disestablished and Deactivated Antarctic Development (VXE) and Oceanographic Development (VXN) squadrons
The VXE and VXN designations were created in 1969 to designate two specialized VX squadrons which were supporting Antarctic and Oceanographic scientific research. The VXN designation was discontinued in 1993 with the disestablishment of VXN-8 and the VXE designation was discontinued in active use with the deactivation of VXE-6, though it continues to designate the inactive squadron.

Squadron Designations still in use

VAQ: Disestablished and Deactivated Tactical Electronics Warfare squadrons and Electronic Attack squadrons
In 1968 the VAQ designation was established to designate "Tactical Electronics Warfare Squadron". Prior to the creation of the VAQ designation there were two squadrons (VAW-13 and VAW-33) which by the late 1950s had been equipped to conduct electronic countermeasures and were providing electronic countermeasures aircraft detachments to deploying Carrier Air Groups. By the late 1950s electronic countermeasures equipment and procedures had been developed from the airborne early warning capabilities of the VAW "Carrier Airborne Early Warning Squadrons" as the technology for detecting airborne threats with radar led to development of electronic countermeasures equipment for countering enemy radar. In 1968 those two squadrons were renamed "Tactical Electronics Warfare Squadron" (while retaining the VAW designation) to more accurately describe their role and differentiate them from the remaining VAW squadrons which were Airborne Early Warning squadrons.

Later in 1968 the VAQ designation was created and those VAW "Tactical Electronics Warfare" squadrons were redesigned to VAQ. At that same time, some VAH squadrons which were operating the KA-3 tanker had electronic countermeasures equipment added to their aircraft and were in turn also designated VAQ squadrons (see the VAH section).

On 30 March 1998 the name of the designation was changed to "Electronic Attack Squadron" and all VAQ squadrons then in existence were renamed from "Tactical Electronics Warfare Squadron-" to "Electronic Attack Squadron-".

VAW: Disestablished and Deactivated Carrier Airborne Early Warning squadrons
The VAW designation was first used in July 1948 with the establishment of VAW-1 and VAW-2 to designate "Carrier Airborne Early Warning Squadron". It was in use for only a month as in August 1948 VAW-1 and VAW-2 were redesignated "Composite Squadron" VC-11 and VC-12. In 1948 the VAW designation was resurrected when VC-11 and VC-12 were redesignated VAW-11 and VAW-12. In 1967, VAW-11 and VAW-12 which were large land based squadrons that provided detachments of Airborne Early Warning aircraft to deploying carrier air wings were redesignated as wings and each of their detachments were established as separate squadrons. Established from VAW-11 were RVAW-110 (a FRS), VAW-111, 112, 113, 114, 115, 116 and established from VAW-12 were RVAW-120 (a FRS), VAW-121, 122, 123, 124. For a short time in 1968 the VAW designation designated "Tactical Electronics Warfare squadron" as well as "Airborne Early Warning squadron" when VAW-13 and VAW-33 which had been operating as electronic countermeasures squadrons were retitled as such until they were redesignated with the new VAQ designation later that year (see the VAQ section).

In 2019 the name of the designation was changed to "Airborne Command and Control Squadron" and all VAW squadrons then in existence were renamed from "Carrier Airborne Early Warning Squadron-" to "Airborne Command and Control Squadron-".

Note: The parenthetical (First use), (Second use) and (1st), (2nd) appended to some designations in the table below are not a part of the squadron designation system. They are added to indicate that the designation was used more than once during the history of U.S. Naval Aviation and which use of the designation is indicated. Absence indicates that the designation was used only once.

VFA: Disestablished and Deactivated Fighter Attack and Strike Fighter squadrons
The VFA designation was created in 1980 when the VA squadrons flying the A-7E Corsair II attack aircraft began transitioning to the new F/A-18A Hornet fighter attack aircraft. The designation combined the "F" fighter and "A" attack designations from the VF and VA designations to create the new "Fighter Attack (VFA) Squadron" designation. In 1983 the VFA designation was renamed from "Fighter Attack Squadron" to "Strike Fighter Squadron" and all then existing VFA squadrons were renamed from "Fighter Attack Squadron-" to "Strike Fighter Squadron-_".

VP: Disestablished Patrol squadrons and VP Designations no longer in use. Also VA(HM), VPB, VB

VP: Deactivated Patrol squadrons (Also VPU)

VQ: Deactivated Fleet Air Reconnaissance squadrons
In 1961 the VQ designation which from 1955 had designated "Electronic Countermeasures Squadron" through 1960 was changed to "Fleet Air Reconnaissance Squadron" as the squadrons rather than simply jamming communications and electronic signals had by then been equipped to collect them for intelligence purposes.

VR: Deactivated Fleet Logistics Support Squadrons
The VR designation was first used in 1948 to designate Transport or Air Transport or Fleet Logistics Air squadrons. In 1958 the name of the designation was changed to Fleet Tactical Support squadron and in 1976 it was again changed to Fleet Logistics Support squadrons as it remains today.

VRC: Disestablished Fleet Logistics Support Squadrons
In 1960 the VRC designation was created to designate squadrons which operated logistics aircraft capable of landing on and taking off from aircraft carriers. These aircraft were known as "COD"s for Carrier Onboard Delivery. The designation name was the same as the VR designation of the time or Fleet Tactical Support squadron. In 1976 the designation was changed to Fleet Logistics Support squadron along with the change in name of the VR designation.

VT: Disestablished and Deactivated Training squadrons
The VT designation was first used in 1920 to designate "Torpedo Plane Squadrons". From 1922 to 1930 it designated "Torpedo & Bombing Plane Squadrons" or "Torpedo and Bombing Squadrons". In 1930 it designated "Torpedo Squadrons" until 1946 when all remaining VT squadrons were redesignated Attack (VA) squadrons. On 1 May 1960 the VT designation was resurrected and existing flying training units were designated "Training Squadrons (VT)". There is no relationship between the training squadrons using the VT designation after 1960 and the Torpedo or Torpedo and Bombing squadrons of the 1920s to 1940s. From 1927 to 1947 training squadrons used the designation "VN". From 1947 to 1960 training units were not designated as squadrons, they were "units" or "groups" called Basic Training Groups (BTG), Advanced Training Units (ATU), Jet Transition Training Units (JTTU) or Multi Engine Training Groups (METG).

Note: The parenthetical (1st) and (2nd) appended to the VT-9 designations in the table below are not a part of the squadron designation system. They are added to indicate that the designation was used twice to designate two different training squadrons. They are not counted in sequence with the actual first use of the VT-9 designation during WWII to designate Torpedo Squadron Nine.

VX: Disestablished and Deactivated Experimental and Development squadrons
The VX designation first appeared in 1927 to designate "Experimental Squadron" and was used until 1943. It was again used beginning in 1946 when four "Experimental and Development" squadrons (VX-1 (still exists today), 2, 3 and 4) were established to develop and evaluate new equipment and methods. From 1946 to 1968 the designation was variously "Experimental and Development" squadron, "Operational Development" squadron, "Air Operational Development" squadron and "Air Development" squadron. In 1969 the designation changed to "Air Test and Evaluation" squadron and it remains as such today.

Disestablished or deactivated helicopter squadrons
See: List of inactive United States Navy helicopter squadrons.

Disestablished Blimp Patrol Squadrons (ZP)

See also
 List of United States Navy aircraft designations (pre-1962) / List of US Naval aircraft
 List of United States Navy aircraft squadrons
 List of United States Navy aircraft wings
 Military aviation
 Modern US Navy carrier air operations
 Naval aviation
 Naval Flight Officer
 United States Marine Corps Aviation
 United States Naval Aviator
Naval aircrewman
VBF

References and notes
Notes

References

Bibliography
Dictionary of American Naval Aviation Squadrons:

External links
 DANAS Volume 1 - The History of VA, VAH, VAK, VAL, VAP and VFA Squadrons (1995)
 Chapter 1 – The Evolution of Aircraft Class and Squadron Designation Systems
 Appendix 4 – U.S. Navy Squadron Designations and Abbreviations
 Appendix 6 – Lineage Listing for VA, VA(AW), VAH, VA(HM), VAK, VAL, VAP, and VFA Squadrons (2000)
 DANAS Volume 2 - The History of VP, VPB, VP(H) and VP(AM) Squadrons
 Chapter 2 – Guidelines for Navy Aviation Squadron Lineage and Insignia
 Appendix 4 – Lineage Listing for VP, VB, VPB, VP(HL), VP(ML), VP(MS) and VP(AM) Squadrons
 OPNAVINST 5030.4G – Navy Aviation Squadron Lineage and Naval Aviation Command Insignia (2012)

Aircraft squadrons
Aircraft squadrons list, Inactive
Squadrons